Annia Aurelia Galeria Lucilla or Lucilla (7 March 148 or 150 – 182) was the second daughter of Roman Emperor Marcus Aurelius and Roman Empress Faustina the Younger. She was the wife of her father's co-ruler and adoptive brother Lucius Verus and an elder sister to later Emperor Commodus. Commodus ordered Lucilla's execution after a failed assassination and coup attempt when she was about 33 years old.

Early life
Born and raised in Rome into an influential political family, Lucilla was a younger twin with her elder brother Gemellus Lucillae, who died around 150. Lucilla's maternal grandparents were Roman Emperor Antoninus Pius and Roman Empress Faustina the Elder and her paternal grandparents were Domitia Lucilla and praetor Marcus Annius Verus.

Marriages and ascension to Empress

In 161, when she was between 11 and 13 years old, Lucilla's father arranged a marriage for her with his co-ruler Lucius Verus. Verus, 18 years her senior, became her husband three years later in Ephesus in 164. At this marriage, she received her title of Augusta and became a Roman Empress. At the same time, Marcus Aurelius and Lucius Verus were fighting a Parthian war in Syria.

Lucilla and Lucius Verus had three children: 
 Aurelia Lucilla was born in 165 in Antioch
 Lucilla Plautia
 Lucius Verus

Aurelia and the boy died young.

Lucilla was an influential and respectable woman and she enjoyed her status. She spent much time in Rome, while Verus was away from Rome much of the time, fulfilling his duties as a co-ruler. Lucius Verus died around 168/169 while returning from the war theater in the Danube region, and as a result, Lucilla lost her status as Empress.

As an unattached link to Emperor Aurelius and to the late co-Emperor Verus and because of her royal-born offspring, Lucilla was not destined for a long widowhood, and thus, a short time later, in 169, her father arranged a second marriage for her with Tiberius Claudius Pompeianus Quintianus from Antioch. He was a Syrian Roman who was twice consul and a political ally to her father, but Lucilla and her mother were against the marriage as a less than ideal match, partly because Quintianus was at least twice Lucilla's age, but also because he was not of her own Roman nobilis social rank though he was descended from rulers in the East. They married nonetheless and, about a year later, in 170, Lucilla bore him a son named Pompeianus.

Rise of Commodus
In 172, Lucilla and Quintianus accompanied Marcus Aurelius to Vindobona (now Vienna) in support of the Danube military campaign and were with him on 17 March 180, when Aurelius died and Commodus became the new emperor. The change meant that any hope of Lucilla becoming Empress again was lost and she and Quintianus returned to Rome.

Lucilla was not happy living the quiet life of a private citizen in Rome, and hated her sister-in-law Bruttia Crispina. Over time, Lucilla became very concerned with her brother Commodus' erratic behaviour and its resulting effect on the stability of the empire.

Plot to assassinate Commodus
In light of her brother's unstable rule, in 182 Lucilla became involved in a plot to assassinate Commodus and replace him with her husband and herself as the new rulers of Rome. Her co-conspirators included Publius Tarrutenius Paternus the Praetorian prefect, her daughter Plautia from her first marriage, a nephew of Quintianus also called Quintianus, and her paternal cousins, the former consul Marcus Ummidius Quadratus Annianus and his sister Ummidia Cornificia Faustina.

Quintianus' nephew, brandishing a dagger or sword, bungled the assassination attempt. As he burst forth from his hiding place to commit the deed, he boasted to Commodus "Here is what the Senate sends to you", giving away his intentions before he had the chance to act. Commodus's guards were faster than Quintianus and the would-be assassin was overpowered and disarmed without injuring the emperor.

Commodus ordered the deaths of Quintianus' nephew and of Marcus Ummidius Quadratus Annianus, and banished Lucilla, her daughter and Ummidia Cornificia Faustina to the Italian island of Capri. He sent a centurion there to execute them later that year. Her son Pompeianus was later murdered by Caracalla.

In popular culture
 In the 1964 film The Fall of the Roman Empire, Lucilla is played by Sophia Loren, her part in the film's plot bearing only a very loose relation to Lucilla's real life.
 In the 2000 film Gladiator, Lucilla is played by Connie Nielsen.
 In the 2016 six-part docuseries Roman Empire: Reign of Blood, Lucilla is played by Tai Berdinner-Blades.

References

Further reading
 Balsdon, J.P.V.D., Roman Women, Barnes & Noble Inc, 1998. .
 D'Ambra, Eve, Roman Women, Cambridge University Press, 2006. .
 Fraschetti, Augusto, (Ed.), Lappin Linda (Transl.), Roman Women, University Of Chicago Press, 1999. .
 Freisenbruch, Annelise, Caesars’ Wives: Sex, Power, and Politics in the Roman Empire, Free Press, 2011. .
 Gardner, Jane F., Women in Roman Law and Society, Indiana University Press, 1991. .
 Peck, Harry Thurston, Harpers Dictionary of Classical Antiquities, Harper & Brothers Publishers, 1898.

140s births
150s births
182 deaths
Nerva–Antonine dynasty
Annii
Aurelii Fulvi
2nd-century Roman empresses
2nd-century executions
Failed assassins
Executed Roman empresses
People executed by the Roman Empire
Capri, Campania
Executed Italian women
Augustae
Lucius Verus
Remarried royal consorts
Daughters of Roman emperors